Adithya TV (romanized Ātityā Tolaikkāṭci) is a 24-hour Tamil comedy pay television channel from the Sun TV Network in India. It ranks fifth in BARC's top five channel list in Tamil. Its competitor is Sirippoli.

Adithya TV is broadcast in Singapore on Mio TV (now Singtel TV) from 15 June 2012 together with Sun TV, It Launched on StarHub TV along with KTV from 5 May 2020, and in Malaysia on Astro on Channel 214 since 15 November 2010.

See also
Sirippoli TV

References

External links
 Official website 
 Adithya TV on YouTube
 Sun TV Network
 Sun Group
 Address of Adithya TV

Tamil-language television channels
Television channels and stations established in 2009
Sun Group
Comedy television networks
Tamil-language comedy television series
Comedy television channels in India
Television stations in Chennai